Reem Miriam Bassous is a Lebanese artist. She was born on July 19, 1978; she was raised in Athens, Greece until she was four years old due to conflict in Lebanon. She moved back to Lebanon later that year. At the age of seventeen, Reem attended the Lebanese American University in Beirut, Lebanon, and at the age of 21 she attended George Washington University in Washington, D.C. There she earned her master's degree in painting and drawing. She moved to Hawaii in 2006, and became a lecturer at the University of Hawaii.

Much of the artist's work deals with her memories of the Lebanese Civil War and its aftereffects.  Memory for Forgetfulness, in the collection of the Honolulu Museum of Art, shows the destruction caused by this conflict.

Solo exhibitions 
 2019. "Endless Red", Aupuni Space, Honolulu, HI
 2016  "Prey/Pray", SBCAST Gallery, Santa Barbara, CA
 2015  Beyond the Archive, Honolulu Museum of Art; Honolulu, HI
 2013  Green Line,  The Washington Studio School Gallery, Washington DC
 2010  Plexus,  Hawaii Pacific University, Honolulu, HI
 2010   My Revolution Begins, The Contemporary Museum Café, Honolulu, HI
 2005   Creative Destruction, RamsayOng Gallery, Kuala Lumpur, Malaysia

Collaborative projects/ exhibitions 
 2019        Artifacts of Place, Stand4 Gallery, Brooklyn, NY
2016        FOUR: Reem Bassous, Pratisha Budhiraja, Deborah Nehmad, Yida Wang. Koa Gallery, Honolulu, HI
 2012        Negotiating Dystopia, Reem Bassous and Maya Portner, Honolulu Museum School of Art, Honolulu, HI
 2012        Hybrid Herd, Reem Bassous and Maya Portner, Thirtyninehotel, Honolulu, HI
 2007        Portraits by Reem Bassous and Meg Harders, Focus Gallery at Meadows Museum, Shreveport, LA
 2002        Calm and Chaos, Work by Reem Bassous and Jodie Biggers, Dimock Gallery, The George Washington University, Washington, DC

Grants/awards 
 2013       The Kafiye Project Competition Winner, Kaflab Foundation, New York, NY
 2011       The John Young Award, Artists of Hawaii Exhibition, Honolulu, HI
 2002       The Langenkamp Award for Abstract Painting, Annual Awards Show, The George Washington University, Washington, DC
 2001       The Glassman Award, Annual Awards Show, The George Washington University, Washington, DC

References

1978 births
Living people
Lebanese artists
Lebanese women artists
George Washington University alumni
Painters from Hawaii